Gerson Orlando Novela (born 12 September 1979) is a Mozamibcan retired basketball player. He played with Clube Ferroviário de Maputo of the Mozambique Professional Basketball League. He is also a member of the Mozambique national basketball team and appeared with the club at the 2009 African Championships for the first time after previously participating with the team in qualifying for the FIBA Africa Championship 2005.

References

1979 births
Ferroviário de Maputo (basketball) players
Sportspeople from Maputo
Living people
Mozambican men's basketball players